Elections to Wigan Council were held on 2 May 2002, with one-third of the council to be re-elected. There had been a number of by-elections in the gap year, with a Labour gain from the Liberal Democrats in Hindsford, effectively cancelling out an earlier loss to them in Atherton. A Labour hold in Hope Carr in-between left both parties unchanged going into the election.

Candidates contesting rose slightly on the prior election's, with the Socialist Alliance's debut eclipsing the Liberal Democrat offering, with 9 candidates to 8, and the newly formed Community Action Party fielding their first handful, as well as a sole BNP contender in Abram. This counteracted the traditional opposition parties - the Conservatives and the Liberal Democrats - fielding slightly less this year and one fewer Independent contester than the last election.

The worrying string of poor turnout seen in recent elections was partially reversed, as turnout rose by a quarter upon the 2000s figure of 19.5%, to 25.2%. The Conservatives and the Independents fell back from their impressive performances in 2000, to the benefit of the newcomers, with Community Action immediately gaining two seats in the previously-unblemished Labour strongholds of Bryn and Lightshaw. Labour successfully defended Orrell from another Tory gain, but suffered a loss in the former Conservative bastion of Swinley, with the Conservatives holding representation in Orrell and Swinley for the first time in just shy of twenty years. Elsewhere, the Lib Dems comfortably captured another seat in Hindsford. These gains reverted Labour's majority to a more normative 58, ending their five-year peak.

Election result

This result had the following consequences for the total number of seats on the Council after the elections:

Ward results

By-elections between 2002 and 2003

References

2002 English local elections
2002
2000s in Greater Manchester